Admiral Lambert may refer to:

Cecil Lambert (1864–1928), British Royal Navy admiral
George Lambert (Royal Navy officer) (1795–1869), British Royal Navy admiral
Mooy Lambert (c. 1550–1625), Dutch Navy vice admiral
Paul Lambert (Royal Navy officer) (born 1954), British Royal Navy vice admiral
Robert Lambert (Royal Navy officer) (1771–1836), British Royal Navy vice admiral
Rowley Lambert (1828–1880), British Royal Navy vice admiral